Rhodes Minnis is a village near Folkestone in Kent, England, located between Lyminge and Stelling Minnis. It is in the civil parish of Elham. It was a gathering place for some of the Swing Riots organizers from Lyminge during the 1830s.

External links

References 

Villages in Kent